Oracle Financial Services Software Limited (OFSS) is a subsidiary of Oracle Corporation. It is involved in financial and insurance technology.

The company claims to have more than 900 customers in over 145 countries. Oracle Financial Services Software Limited is ranked No. 9 in IT companies of India and overall ranked No. 253 in Fortune India 500 list in 2011.

History

Part of Citi corporation (I-Flex Solutions)
iCorp Oversea Software Ltd. ("COSL") was owned by CITIBANK in 1990 and later went on to be known as I-FLEX in the world market. After some time, it merged with another company, and a new company was formed, namely Citicorp Information Technologies Industries Ltd ("CITIL"). Rajesh Hukku was named to head CITIL.  While COSL's mandate was to serve Citicorp's internal needs globally and be a cost center, CITIL's mandate was to be profitable by serving not only Citicorp but the whole global financial software market. Largely known as I-FLEX, it was eventually renamed as Oracle Financial Services Software.

Early history
CITIL was started with a universal banking product named called MicroBanker (which became successful in some English speaking parts of Africa and other developing regions over the next 3–4 years) and the retail banking product Finware. In the mid-90s, the firm developed Flexcube (stylized FLEXCUBE) at its Bangalore Centre. After the launch of Flexcube, all of CITIL's transnational banking products were brought under a common brand umbrella. Subsequently, the company's name was changed to I-FLEX Solutions India Ltd.

Oracle Corporation

Oracle purchased Citigroup's 41% stake in I-FLEX solutions for US$593 million in August 2005, a further 7.52% in March and April 2006, and 3.2% in an open-market purchase in mid-April 2006.

On 14 August 2006, Oracle Financial Services announced it would acquire Mantas, a US-based anti-money laundering and compliance software company for US$122.6 million. The company part-funded the transaction through a preferential share allotment to the majority shareholder Oracle Corporation.

On 12 January 2007, after an open offer price to minority shareholders, Oracle increased its stake in I-FLEX to around 83%.

On 4 April 2008, Oracle changed the name of the company to Oracle Financial Services Limited.

On 24 October 2010, Oracle announced the appointment of Chaitanya M Kamat as Managing Director and CEO of Oracle Financial Services Software Limited. The outgoing CEO and MD, N.R.K. Raman retired from these posts after 25 years of service.

Now, Oracle Financial Services Software Limited is a major part of Oracle Financial Services Global Business Unit (FSGBU) under Harinderjit (Sonny) Singh who is the Vice President & Group Head of Oracle FSGBU World Wide.

Products and services

Oracle Financial Services Software Limited has two main streams of business. The products division (formerly called BPD – Banking Products Division) and PrimeSourcing. The company's offerings cover retail, corporate and investment banking, funds, cash management, trade, treasury, payments, lending, private wealth management, asset management, and business analytics. The company undertook a re-branding exercise in the latter half of 2008. As part of this, the corporate website was integrated with Oracle's website. Various divisions, services, and products were renamed to reflect the new identity post alignment with Oracle.

Recently, Oracle Financial Services launched products for Internal Capital Adequacy Assessment Process, exposure management, enterprise performance management and energy, and commodity trading compliance.

The company promotes its BPO business process outsourcing business via its subsidiary Equinox Corporation which is based in Irvine, California.

 In 2002 DotEx International Joint Venture NSE.IT and i-flex solutions Ltd signed a memorandum of understanding (MoU) with BgSE Financials Ltd, to provide Internet trading services.

See also

List of IT consulting firms
Fortune India 500
List of companies of India
TCS BaNCS
Finacle

References

Banking software companies
Oracle acquisitions
Software companies based in Mumbai
Banks established in 1991
Financial services companies established in 1991
Indian companies established in 1991
Software companies established in 1991
1991 establishments in Maharashtra
Companies listed on the National Stock Exchange of India
Companies listed on the Bombay Stock Exchange